Roger Quarles Mills (March 30, 1832September 2, 1911) was an American lawyer and politician. During the American Civil War, he served as an officer in the Confederate States Army. Later, he served in the US Congress, first as a representative and later as a senator.

As the top Democrat on the powerful United States House Committee on Ways and Means during the first Grover Cleveland and Benjamin Harrison administrations, Mills was the leading advocate in Congress for trade liberalization. He was ultimately unsuccessful in passing any major tariff reduction and, after Republicans won control of the House on a pro-tariff platform, was unsuccessful in blocking the McKinley Tariff of 1890. He ran for Speaker after Democrats regained the House in 1891 but lost to Charles F. Crisp.

Early life
Born in Todd County, Kentucky, Mills attended the common schools and moved to Texas in 1849. There, he studied law, passed the bar, and began practicing in Corsicana at the age of 20 after the Texas legislature made an exception to the usual age requirement. He was a member of the Texas House of Representatives from 1859 until 1860, when he enlisted in the Confederate States Army. He served throughout the Civil War and took part as a private in the Battle of Wilson's Creek, and as a colonel commanded the 10th Texas Infantry Regiment at Arkansas Post, Chickamauga (where he commanded the brigade of Gen. James Deshler during part of the battle), Missionary Ridge and the Atlanta Campaign.

U.S. Representative
He was then elected as a Democrat to the US House of Representatives and served from 1873 to 1892. In 1891, Mills was a candidate in the Democratic caucus for Speaker of the U.S. House of Representatives, but he was defeated by Charles F. Crisp (1845–1896) of Georgia.

In the 1880s, when Prohibition sentiment was rising in Texas, Mills refused to make any political concessions. Reportedly, he declared in one speech, "If lightning were to strike all the drunkards, there would not be a live Prohibition party in Texas." (Mills claimed to have been misquoted and that he had said "there would not be many [members of the party] left.") Elsewhere, he was said to have vowed, "A good sluice of pine top whiskey would improve the morals of the Dallas [Prohibition] convention and the average Prohibitionist." (Mills again offered a correction and insisted that he had not used the words "average Prohibitionist.").

Mills quickly became noted as one of the ablest, if hottest-tempered, debaters on the Democratic side of the House and was commonly agreed.to be a man "possessed of the demon of work." The reporter Frank G. Carpenter described him as true as steel and unpretentious in dress: "He is tall, straight and big chested," he wrote in 1888. "The distance between the top button of his high vest and the small of his back is longer than the width of the shoulders of the ordinary man, and he has a biceps which, if put into training, would knock down an ox. He is a fighter, too, and goes into this Congressional struggle with a brain trained to warfare.... He is a successful man, and one who inspires confidence."

Chairmanship of the Committee on Ways and Means
Mills had made the tariff his special study and long been recognized as one of the leading authorities on the Democratic side. After the defeat of House Ways and Means Committee Chairman William Morrison in the 1886 election, Mills became the next chair of the U.S. House Committee on Ways and Means when the 50th Congress met. His selection, according to Ida Tarbell, a historian on the tariff, "was a red rag to the high protectionists, for Mr. Mills was an out-and-out free trader." Debate over the tariff issue had been thrust upon the United States by President Grover Cleveland in his annual December message to Congress on December 6, 1887. He requested for Congress to pass a drastic reduction of the tariff on many manufactured goods to promote trade and reduce the cost of living for ordinary citizens. Indeed, Chairman Mills, using the Walker Tariff of 1846 as a guideline, had been drafting a bill since September 1887 that would address several of the proposals included by Cleveland in his December message. As it turned out, most of Mills's work went for naught, as he later explained: "When I got to work with my brethren on the bill I found that it would not go, and I had to abandon my ad valorem tariff bill. The schoolmaster had not been sufficiently around, to bring our people back to the Democratic principle of taxation as to value." The bill became known as the "Mills Tariff Bill of 1888." The Mills Bill was reported out of the Ways and Means Committee in April 1888.

The bill provided for a reduction of the duties on sugar, earthenware, glassware, plate glass, woolen goods and other articles; the substitution of ad valorem for specific duties in many cases; and the placing of lumber (of certain kinds), hemp, wool, flax, borax, tin plates, salt and other articles on the free list. The bill looked likely to split the Democratic Party. Just two years previously, the high tariff wing of the Democratic Party had been able to muster 35 votes in the House. However, the Mills Bill had now become so highly partisan that when the bill was passed by the Democratic House on July 21, 1888, only four Democratic representatives voted against it. The high-tariff wing of the Democratic Party had largely been wiped out by the passage of the Mills Bill of 1888.

Although the Mills Bill passed the House, the Republican Senate amended it heavily, and it never passed into law. Instead, it became the chief issue in the 1888 presidential election. Critics warned that American manufacturers could not compete against the flood of manufactured goods from Britain, and campaign crowds marched the streets chanting, "No! no! no Free Trade!" (However, the bill was not anything close to being a free-trade measure but offered an average reduction of only seven percent, and many items were left untouched.) "If Mills of Texas does not shut down, many other mills will have to," a California newspaper warned. In the 1888 election, Republican Benjamin Harrison, a strong high-tariff supporter lost the popular vote nationwide to Cleveland, but Harrison managed to narrowly win both swing states of New York and Indiana and so won the presidency in the Electoral College-based, largely by the tariff issue.

1891 speakership candidacy
Mills was known to have aspirations to be speaker after the retirement of John G. Carlisle. In late 1891, with the House returning to Democratic control, the Texas representative put himself in the running against Representative Charles Crisp from Georgia. Before the caucus met, Mills had 120 votes pledged to him, and if all of them had kept their word, he would have won, but only 105 did so on the final, thirtieth, ballot, against Crisp's 119. The reason, apparently, was that Mills refused to make deals.

Some two dozen members wanted a guarantee of specific committee assignments in return for their support, but Mills would have none of it. Reportedly, Representative William Springer of Illinois, who was also contending to be speaker, offered to drop out if Mills would appoint him chair of Ways and Means and was told gruffly to put his offer in writing. As a result, the night before the caucus voted, Springer withdrew on Crisp's behalf, and Crisp made him chairman of Ways and Means, subsequently. To Representative Tom Johnson of Cleveland, one of Mills's most earnest backers, the Texas representative's conduct looked like political insanity. "I wish you wouldn't be a fool," he burst out; "give me two chairmanships and ask me no questions and I will elect you on the next ballot." He got only a shake of the head in reply.

Mills's problems, however, were deeper than his failure as a horse-trader. For one thing, his irascibility and the regularity with which he lost his temper made many of his party friends worry that he lacked the self-control necessary to be speaker. The party's job would be hard enough without what one newspaper called Mills's "tempestuous style." His selection would have signaled that the Democratic Party's main agenda would be lowering the tariff drastically. Crisp was much less associated with tariff reform than with the coinage of free silver, which, to most Southern Democrats, was the top issue by late 1891. Among the Silver Democrats, it did not help Mills to have former President Cleveland's backing or, among those favoring the presidential nomination of Cleveland's rival, Senator David Bennett Hill of New York, that Hill threw his weight behind Crisp's candidacy, too.

Mills took badly to his rejection, issuing a letter that was quickly made public that the Democratic Party had been hurt more than he by his rejection as well as threatening that "a large element that has been voting with us [would] abandon us" in the coming election unless those who had defeated him were met with rebuke by their party.

US Senator
Mills was elected to the US Senate from Texas in 1892 to fill the vacant seat of John H. Reagan and continued to serve in that post until 1899.

In 1893, when President Grover Cleveland sought repeal of the Sherman Silver Purchase Act, Mills gave loyal support. Silver coinage was popular with both parties in Texas, and Democrats in particular felt that Mills had betrayed them. His action probably cost him re-election in 1898.

Other friends also noticed a change in him. His old colleague and co-worker in tariff reform, former Representative William L. Wilson of West Virginia, wrote in his diary in 1896, "Poor Mills, how he seems to have gone to pieces since the time when he was leading the tariff reform forces in the House, and a welcome and strong speaker on that great issue all over the country. Today he made one of the most extreme and wild jingo speeches in the Senate on the Cuban question that has marked the whole debate. Not less erratic has been his course for two years past on the financial question."

Death and legacy
He died in Corsicana, Texas, and was buried in Oakwood Cemetery, Corsicana. Roger Mills County, Oklahoma, was named after him.

References

Sources
 Retrieved on 2009-05-04

External links

1832 births
1911 deaths
People from Todd County, Kentucky
Democratic Party members of the Texas House of Representatives
People of Texas in the American Civil War
Confederate States Army officers
Democratic Party United States senators from Texas
Democratic Party members of the United States House of Representatives from Texas
19th-century American politicians
Deans of the United States House of Representatives